Shade Junior/Senior High School is a public secondary school serving nearly 300 students in grades 7-12 in the Shade Township coal patch of Cairnbrook.

Alma Mater
Our strong band can ne'er be broken
form'd in old Shade High
far surpassing wealth unspoken
seal'd by friendship's tie
alma mater, alma mater,
deep graven on each heart
shall be found unwav'ring true when
we from life shall part.
High school life at best is passing,
gliding swiftly by;
then let us pledge in word and deed,
our love for old Shade High.

Curriculum
Shade offers instruction  in the following program areas:
 Arts and Humanities - including the Music Curriculum
 Driver's Education
 Family & Consumer Sciences
 Health, Safety & Physical Education - Including Health in the 8th Grade and First Aid during the Sophomore year
 Mathematics
 Science
 Social Studies
 Technology - Including Web Design

Vocational education
Students in grades 10–12, who wish to pursue training in a specific career path or field may attend the Somerset County Technology Center in Somerset Township.

Clubs and activities
There are the following clubs  at Shade:
 Band
 Cheerleaders
 Drama Club
 Envirothon
 National Honor Society
 SADD
 Ski Club
 Student Council
 TATU (Teens Against Tobacco Use)
 Varsity Club
 Yearbook

Athletics
Shade participates in PIAA District V's  WestPac Conference. Students at Shade participate in Johnstown Christian School's Soccer team and Shanksville-Stonycreek'sGolf, Rifle and Girls Tennis Teams. Meanwhile, Shanksville-Stonycreek's students come to Shade to participate in Football and Track and Field under cooperative sports agreements.

References

Public high schools in Pennsylvania
Public middle schools in Pennsylvania
Schools in Somerset County, Pennsylvania